was a junior college in Naha, Okinawa, Japan, and was part of the Kakazugakuen network.

The institute was founded in 1958 and closed in 2000.

Japanese junior colleges
Universities and colleges in Okinawa Prefecture